John Peter Mettauer (1787–1875) was an American surgeon and gynecologist. He was the son of surgeon Francis Joseph Mettauer.

Biography
John Peter Mettauer was born in Prince Edward County, Virginia in 1787. He was a pupil at Hampden-Sydney College, followed by studies at the University of Pennsylvania, where he obtained his medical doctorate in 1809. In 1837 he founded a private medical school located between Prince Edward Court House and Kingsville, Virginia. In 1847 he allied his school with Randolph-Macon College, becoming the first medical department at Randolph-Macon.

Mettauer is remembered for his development of innovative surgical practices. Along with his two sons, he trained many physicians at his private medical school. In the 1838, he performed the first successful repair of vesicovaginal fistula in America. He is also given credit for performing the first cleft palate operation in the Americas (1827).

Mettauer also designed and developed his own surgical instruments, some of which are on display at the Esther Thomas Atkinson Museum at Hampden-Sydney College. Also, The John Peter Mettauer Award for Excellence in Research is a prestigious award issued by Hampden-Sydney College.

He died from kidney disease at his home in Prince Edward County on November 22, 1875.

References

 Innovative Plastic Surgeons (biography)

External links
 Hampden-Sydney College
 Prince Edward County: A Brief History
 A sketch of Dr. John Peter Mettauer of Virginia by George Ben Johnston

American surgeons
American gynecologists
1787 births
1875 deaths
Randolph–Macon College faculty
Hampden–Sydney College alumni
Perelman School of Medicine at the University of Pennsylvania alumni